A number of vessels of the People's Liberation Army Navy have borne the name Xining, after the capital Xining.

 , in service 1989–2013. Now a museum ship in Taizhou.
 , a Type 052D destroyer, in service since 2017.

References 

People's Liberation Army Navy ship names